Remy Ong (born 22 November 1978) is a Singaporean bowler and former world champion.

Remy made his name in the 2002 Asian Games at Busan as the captain for the men's team when he became the nation's only second male multiple-gold medalist in the competition's 51-year history, winning three gold medals. He developed into a national bowler at the age of 16. Remy won his first perfect game at the ATBC Championships in 1998 at the age of 20. The bowler also achieved number one status for bowling in Asia and fifth in the world in 2002 and came close to becoming the champion of the 38th AMF World Cup. In the same year, he was voted sportsman of the year. A year later, he was given the Singapore Youth Award for 2003. His crowning achievement to date is winning the singles title in the WTBA World Tenpin Bowling Championships at Busan, South Korea in 2006.

References

External links
 Industry profile of Remy Ong

Singaporean ten-pin bowling players
Singaporean sportspeople of Chinese descent
1978 births
Living people
Asian Games medalists in bowling
Bowlers at the 2010 Asian Games
Bowlers at the 2006 Asian Games
Bowlers at the 2002 Asian Games
Asian Games gold medalists for Singapore
Asian Games silver medalists for Singapore
Medalists at the 2002 Asian Games
Medalists at the 2006 Asian Games
Medalists at the 2010 Asian Games
Southeast Asian Games silver medalists for Singapore
Southeast Asian Games gold medalists for Singapore
Southeast Asian Games medalists in bowling
Competitors at the 2005 Southeast Asian Games
Competitors at the 2001 World Games